Death Before Dishonor XIV was the 14th Death Before Dishonor professional wrestling event produced by Ring of Honor (ROH), which took place on August 19, 2016, at Sam's Town Live in Sunrise Manor, Nevada. Death Before Dishonor XIV was broadcast on ROH Wrestling's home page as an Internet pay-per-view.

Several wrestlers from New Japan Pro-Wrestling (NJPW) – with which ROH has a talent exchange partnership – also appeared on the card.

Storylines
Death Before Dishonor XIV featured professional wrestling matches, involving different wrestlers from pre-existing scripted feuds, plots, and storylines that played out on ROH's television programs. Wrestlers portrayed villains or heroes as they followed a series of events that built tension and culminated in a wrestling match or series of matches.

Results

See also
 2016 in professional wrestling

References

External links
Death Before Dishonor XIV at ROHWrestling.com

2016 in Nevada
2016 Ring of Honor pay-per-view events
August 2016 events in the United States
Events in Sunrise Manor, Nevada
Professional wrestling shows in the Las Vegas Valley
14